The Food and Drug Board of Authority (abbreviated FDBA) is Burma's national regulatory agency, responsible for regulation of therapeutic goods, including the manufacture, import, export, storage, distribution and sale of food and drugs, in the interests of public safety. The agency was established under the 1992 National Drug Law. According to the 1992 law, the membership is led by the Minister of Health and Deputy Minister of Health, who act as Chairman and Vice-Chairman respectively. FDBA is the highest authority of food and drug regulations.

See also
Ministry of Health (Burma)
Food and Drug Administration (Burma)

References

Medical and health organisations based in Myanmar
Drugs in Myanmar
National agencies for drug regulation
Food safety organizations
Government agencies established in 1995
Regulation in Myanmar